Anton Baraniak (born 20 June 1951) is a Slovak former weightlifter. He competed for Czechoslovakia at the 1980 Summer Olympics and the 1988 Summer Olympics.

References

External links
 

1951 births
Living people
Slovak male weightlifters
Olympic weightlifters of Czechoslovakia
Weightlifters at the 1980 Summer Olympics
Weightlifters at the 1988 Summer Olympics
People from Hlohovec
Sportspeople from the Trnava Region
20th-century Slovak people